Skylar Ackerman (born August 20, 2001) is a Canadian curler from Saskatoon, Saskatchewan. She currently skips her own team out of the Sutherland Curling Club.

Career
Ackerman made her first appearance at the national level at the 2018 Canadian U18 Curling Championships. There, she skipped her Saskatchewan rink of Madison Johnson, Chantel Hoag and Samantha McLaren to a 4–2 round robin record, qualifying for the championship pool. The team then won both of their championship round games to earn a berth in the playoffs. After defeating Alberta's Ryleigh Bakker 6–5 in the semifinal, they lost 6–3 in the championship game to Nova Scotia's Isabelle Ladouceur, settling for silver.

The following season, Team Ackerman lost the provincial final of the Saskatchewan junior championship to the Rachel Erickson rink. However, because Prince Albert, Saskatchewan was hosting the 2019 Canadian Junior Curling Championships, Saskatchewan got two berths into the national championship. Team Ackerman qualified as the Saskatchewan Host Team. Through the round robin, the team posted a 1–5 record, eventually finishing in thirteenth place with a 2–7 record. Also during the 2018–19 season, Team Ackerman represented Saskatchewan at the 2019 Canada Winter Games in Red Deer, Alberta. Through the round robin, the team finished in fifth place with a 6–4 record, qualifying for the playoffs. They then lost to Nova Scotia's Cally Moore 6–3 in the quarterfinals, finishing sixth overall.

With the rest of her team aging out of juniors, Ackerman formed a new rink with Emily Haupstein, Taylor Stremick and Abbey Johnson to try to capture the 2020 provincial junior title. Through the round robin, the team finished in first with a 6–1 record, earning a spot in the 1 vs. 2 game. There, they lost to Ashley Thevenot 6–4 but bounced back with an 11–6 victory over Krystal Englot in the semifinal game. In the provincial final, they were defeated once again by the Thevenot rink in a 7–5 decision.

During the abbreviated 2020–21 season, Team Ackerman played in three events. After failing to reach the playoffs twice, they made the semifinals of the SWCT South Moose Jaw event where they were defeated by Amber Holland. The following season, the team altered their lineup, moving Haupstein to skip and Ackerman to third. The team did not find much success, failing to qualify in any of their four events. At the provincial junior championship, they failed to reach the playoffs.

Personal life
Ackerman is currently a kinesiology student at the University of Saskatchewan.

Teams

References

External links

2001 births
Canadian women curlers
Living people
Curlers from Saskatoon
21st-century Canadian women
University of Saskatchewan alumni